Don Wharton (born December 22, 1951, in Fort Wayne, Indiana) is a Christian musician.

Background
Don Wharton was born Don Gordon to Howard and Millie Gordon. His father died when he was eleven years old and his mother remarried Canadian hockey player Len Wharton. He has been a professional musician since 1979.

He along with six others are known for surviving a plane crash into the Bering Sea on August 13, 1993, while returning from Russia.  He currently lives in Fort Wayne, Indiana and continues to travel extensively. In October, 2008, Don toured Shanghai, China. Don recently (when?) released his 22nd solo album titled ABUNDANTLY.

Crash and rescue
On August 13, 1993, Don and a group of six other missionaries were coming home from a mission trip to Russia. They were on a small twin engine plane over the Bering Sea near Nome, Alaska when the engines gave out. They floated in the 36 °F/2 °C water over 3 to 6 foot waves for 35–70 minutes before being rescued by helicopter. The rescue crew brought 7 body bags because no one had ever survived more than 15 minutes in that water. The last person was rescued after 70 minutes of being in the water and every single one of the group survived. Don and his group are noted for being the only survivors of a plane crash into the Bering Sea and the only survivors of water temperatures that cold. Don now tells this story when he visits different churches and groups around the country.

External links
Official Website
Milwaukee Journal Sentinel. November 26, 1993

Partial discography
Don Wharton has recorded over 20 albums, including:
Uncut Diamond (1979)
Lift High The Cross (1983)
Count It All Joy (1999)
A Sign For The Times (2001)
Finding The Way (2007)
Abundanty (2010)
Encouragement
Don & Emily Wharton - Rain Down Your Love

American Lutherans
Living people
1951 births